Clausophyidae is a family of cnidarians belonging to the order Siphonophorae.

Genera:
 Chuniphyes Lens & van Riemsdijk, 1908
 Clausophyes Lens & van Riemsdijk, 1908
 Crystallophyes Moser, 1925
 Heteropyramis Moser, 1925
 Kephyes Keferstein & Ehlers, 1860
 Kephyes Pugh, 2006

References

 
Calycophorae
Cnidarian families